The city of Montgomery, the capital and second-largest city of the U.S. state of Alabama, has been the birthplace and home of these notable individuals.

Arts and entertainment

Music

Civil rights

Literature and journalism

Military

Politics

Science and medicine

Sports

Others

See also
List of people from Alabama
List of mayors of Montgomery, Alabama
Alabama State University alumni

References

 
Montgomery, Alabama
Montgomery